Ağamalılar (also, Ağamallar and Agamalylar) is a village and municipality in the Imishli Rayon of Azerbaijan.  It has a population of 542.

References 

Populated places in Imishli District